"What's Happenin!" (also titled as "What's Happnin!") is a song by American hip hop group Ying Yang Twins. It is the third single from their third studio album Me & My Brother (2003) and features American rapper Trick Daddy. The song was produced by Mr. Collipark.

Critical reception
Writing for RapReviews, Damon Brown cited the song as one of the tracks from Me & My Brother in which the "guest stars fall in line right into Ying Yang's way of doing things, as opposed to bringing something fresh to the mix", which he described as interesting and somewhat disappointing. Gil Kaufman of Rolling Stone mentioned the song as an example of a track with "shouted, crack-pipe catchy hooks" and verses that "feel like poorly executed foreplay".

Charts

References

2003 songs
2004 singles
Ying Yang Twins songs
Trick Daddy songs
Songs written by Trick Daddy
Songs written by Mr. Collipark
TVT Records singles